Kafr El Sheikh University is an Egyptian university established in 2006, located at Kafr El Sheikh, in the middle of the Nile Delta. The University has a number of faculties (or colleges) such as: Engineering, Medicine, Physiotherapy and Nursing, Pharmacy, Veterinary Medicine, Science, Education, Agriculture, Arts, Specific Education, Commerce, Physical Education.

References

External links
 Kafrelsheikh University website

2006 establishments in Egypt
Educational institutions established in 2006
Universities in Egypt